Saint Pudens was an early Christian saint and martyr.

He is mentioned as a layman of the Roman Church in 2 Timothy 4:21.

He is said to have been the son of Quintus Cornelius Pudens, a Roman Senator, and his wife Priscilla. According to legend, they were among the first converted by St. Peter in Rome.

Pudens was baptised by Peter, who was a guest in his parents' house in Rome. Pudens was martyred under Nero (reigned 54–68). He is commemorated on April 14 in the Eastern Orthodox Church calendar and May 19 according to the Dominican Martyrology.

He is said to have had two sons, Novatus and Timotheus, and two daughters, Praxedes and Pudentiana, all saints, but if Pudens' life is documented, those of his daughters are derived only by the existence of two ancient churches, Santa Prassede and Santa Pudenziana in Rome.

The acts of the synod of Pope Symmachus (499) show the existence of a titulus Pudentis, a church with the authority to administer sacraments, which was also known as ecclesia Pudentiana.

Notes

References
 Martial, Epigrams, ed. & trans. D. R. Shackleton Bailey, Harvard University Press, 1993
 George Edmundson (1913), The Church in Rome in the First Century, Note C: The Pudens Legend
 William Smith (1884), Smith's Bible Dictionary

External links
April Synaxarion
St. Pudens at Catholic Online

Dominican Martyrology for May

Seventy disciples
1st-century Christian martyrs
Saints from Roman Italy
1st-century deaths
Year of birth unknown
People in the Pauline epistles